Counter Investigation (French: Contre-enquête) is 1930 crime film directed by John Daumery and starring Daniel Mendaille, Suzy Vernon and Jeanne Helbling. It was made by Warner Brothers as the French-language version of their film Those Who Dance. Such Multiple-language versions were common during the early years of sound before dubbing became more widespread. It was made at the company's Burbank Studios in California and shot using Vitaphone.

Cast
 Daniel Mendaille as Diamond Joe
 Suzy Vernon as 	Suzy
 Jeanne Helbling as 	Betty
 Georges Mauloy as 	Benson
 Rolla Norman as 	Dan
 Louis Mercier as Tonio
 Frank O'Neill as 	Fred
 Emile Chautard as 	O'Brien

References

Bibliography
 Liebman, Roy. Vitaphone Films: A Catalogue of the Features and Shorts. McFarland, 2003.
 Waldman, Harry. Missing Reels: Lost Films of American and European Cinema. McFarland, 2000.

External links

1930 films
1930 crime films
American black-and-white films
American crime films
Films directed by Jean Daumery
1930s French-language films
American multilingual films
Warner Bros. films
1930 multilingual films
1930s American films